Francis Seow, born Seow Tiang Siew (11 October 1928 – 21 January 2016), was a Singaporean lawyer who was Solicitor-General of Singapore and later the President of the Law Society of Singapore. 

Seow started his legal career in 1956 in the Singapore Legal Service, becoming Solicitor-General in 1969 before entering private practice in 1972. During his legal career, he was known for having both prosecuted and defended murderers such as Sunny Ang, Mimi Wong and Tan Mui Choo. After he was elected president of the Law Society of Singapore in 1986, he had a falling-out with Prime Minister Lee Kuan Yew over the Law Society's role in commenting on legislation. 

In the 1988 general election, Seow contested in Eunos GRC as a candidate of the opposition Workers' Party, against the governing People's Action Party. He lost with 49.11% of the vote. Before the election, Seow he been detained for 72 days without trial under the Internal Security Act. After being accused of tax evasion, Seow left for the United States for health treatment, subsequently disregarding numerous court summons to return to Singapore to stand trial. He was eventually convicted in absentia. Called a "prisoner of conscience" by Amnesty International in 2007, Seow was a frequent speaker at university talks outside of Singapore.

Legal career 
Seow was born in 1928 in Singapore and educated at Saint Joseph's Institution before he read law at the Middle Temple and became a qualified lawyer. He joined the Singapore Legal Service in 1956 as a prosecutor and rose through the ranks to become the Solicitor-General in 1969, a position he held until 1971. Seow led a Commission of Inquiry in the Secondary IV examination boycott by Chinese students in 1963. For his work, Seow was awarded the Public Administration Medal (Gold). During his time as a prosecutor, Seow prosecuted multiple notorious murderers and sent them to the gallows, including Sunny Ang, Mimi Wong, and 18 of the prisoners involved in the Pulau Senang prison riot.

Seow eventually left the Singapore Legal Service and entered private practice in 1972. In 1985, he defended Tan Mui Choo, one of the three murderers in the Toa Payoh ritual murders. Tan was eventually executed after an unsuccessful appeal against her conviction and death sentence.

In 1973, Seow was suspended from law practice for 12 months by Chief Justice Wee Chong Jin for breaching an undertaking given on behalf of his junior law partner to Attorney-General Tan Boon Teik. Nevertheless, he was later elected as a council member of the Law Society of Singapore in 1976 and became President of the Law Society in 1986.

1988 general election and conviction for tax evasion 
Seow's new appointment as President of the Law Society led to a falling-out with Prime Minister Lee Kuan Yew after he became embroiled in the politics surrounding the role of the Law Society. Seow had envisaged a restoration of the role of the Law Society to comment on legislation that the government churned out without any meaningful parliamentary debate, to which Lee took special exception. As a result, Lee caused special legislation to be passed that deprived the Law Society of any power to comment on legislation unless specifically asked to by the government. Seow stood for the 1988 general election as a candidate of the opposition Workers' Party team contesting in Eunos Group Representation Constituency against the ruling People's Action Party (PAP). However, his team managed to secure 49.11% of valid votes and lost marginally to the PAP.

Just before the election, on 6 May 1988, Seow was detained without trial under the Internal Security Act for 72 days. He was accused of having received political campaign finance from the United States to promote democracy in Singapore. According to his account, he was subjected to torture, including sleep deprivation and intensely cold air conditioning. Later, while awaiting trial for alleged tax evasion, he left for the United States for health treatment and disregarded numerous court summons to return to stand trial. Subsequently, he was convicted in absentia.

Life in exile 
While living in exile, Seow spoke at events organised by student societies in universities outside of Singapore. In a 1989 interview in London, Seow told The Sunday Times that he would return to Singapore to face tax evasion charges.

On 16 October 2007, Amnesty International issued a public statement mentioning Seow as one of two prominent Singaporean lawyers who were penalised for exercising their right to express their opinions. Amnesty International also called him a "prisoner of conscience."

On 8 October 2011, Seow and Tang Fong Har publicly addressed a Singapore Democratic Party forum via teleconferencing. The Singapore Police Force investigated the legality of the event on the following day.

Death 
Seow died in Boston on 21 January 2016 at the age of 87. Chee Soon Juan, the secretary-general of the Singapore Democratic Party, announced the news of Seow's death on his Facebook page. Seow was survived by two sons, and two daughters. His wife, Rauni Marjatta Kivilaakso, died in 1988 after a long battle with cancer.

Writings
In his semi-autobiography, To Catch a Tartar: A Dissident in Lee Kuan Yew's Prison, Seow wrote about his career in the Singapore Legal Service, opposition politics and his personal experience of being detained by the Internal Security Department. He also accuses the Singapore government of authoritarianism and human rights abuse under Lee Kuan Yew's administration. The book also contains a foreword by Devan Nair, the third President of Singapore, equally critical of the Singaporean government. Seow also wrote another book, The Media Enthralled, which describes how he believes the Singapore government undermined freedom of the media and turned the media into pro-government mouthpieces. He is also the author of Beyond Suspicion? – The Singapore Judiciary that explores key cases in which the Singapore judiciary has bowed to political pressure.

See also
 Tang Fong Har
 Internal Security Act
 Operation Spectrum
 Chee Soon Juan

References

Notes

Bibliography

External links
 Review of To Catch a Tartar written by D. Zagoria
 Review written by Francis Seow - Escape from Paradise
 I'll return to face charges, says Francis Seow 
 New bid made to get trial started, Seow knew about summonses, says prosecuters

1928 births
2016 deaths
Amnesty International prisoners of conscience held by Singapore
Harvard Law School faculty
Attorneys-General of Singapore
Singaporean emigrants to the United States
Singaporean exiles
20th-century Singaporean lawyers
Singaporean people of Chinese descent
Workers' Party (Singapore) politicians
Singaporean Non-constituency Members of Parliament
Singaporean prisoners and detainees
Recipients of the Pingat Pentadbiran Awam